= The Ink and Paint Club =

The Ink and Paint Club may refer to:

- The Ink and Paint Club, a group of artists who were employed by Walt Disney
- The Ink and Paint Club (TV series) on Disney Channel
- The Ink and Paint Club, a fictional night club in Who Framed Roger Rabbit
